The Xtreme Soccer League (XSL) was an indoor soccer league that began play in December 2008. Four teams from the former Major Indoor Soccer League participated in the first XSL season: the Chicago Storm, Detroit Ignition, Milwaukee Wave, and New Jersey Ironmen. Other former MISL teams joined the National Indoor Soccer League or Professional Arena Soccer League.

The XSL officially launched on 16 September 2008, with a press conference in Milwaukee, Wisconsin. Brian Loftin was the XSL's commissioner. Each team played a 20-game schedule beginning in December and ending in late March.  There were no playoffs.

On 3 December 2008, the XSL announced that Brine would supply the Triumph X 600 as the official match ball.

Citing economic trouble, the XSL folded in July 2009.  Although the league officially called it a one-year hiatus, the league never resumed play.

Teams

XSL champions

Average attendance

Xtreme Soccer Xperience 
The Xtreme Soccer Xperience (XSL's parent company) held "3 vs. 3" tournaments, beach soccer tournaments, street soccer tournaments, and freestyle juggling competitions. The league also offered a fantasy season to fans, similar to fantasy football.

References

 
Defunct indoor soccer leagues in the United States
Sports leagues established in 2008
Sports leagues disestablished in 2009